USS ARL-6 was one of 39 Achelous-class landing craft repair ships built for the United States Navy during World War II.

Originally laid down as LST-82 on 25 March 1943 at Jeffersonville, Indiana by the Jeffersonville Boat & Machine Company; launched on 9 June 1943; sponsored by Mrs. G. D. Kellogg; redesignated ARL-6 on 20 July 1943; and commissioned on 26 July 1943.

On 2 August 1943, she was decommissioned and transferred to the United Kingdom as HM LSE-2. The tank landing ship never saw active service with the United States Navy. She was returned by the United Kingdom on 21 May 1946 and she was struck from the Naval Vessel Register on 29 October 1946.

On 20 August 1947 she was sold to Argentina as ARA Ingeniero Gadda (Q-22) and served that government until she was decommissioned on 25 August 1960. She was sold by the Argentine Navy in 1968 to Bottachi S. A. (Argentina), for trade between Argentina and Brazil, after which time she was renamed MV Tierra Del Fuego.

References
 
 

 

Achelous-class repair ships
Achelous-class repair ships converted from LST-1-class ships
Ships built in Jeffersonville, Indiana
1943 ships
World War II auxiliary ships of the United Kingdom
Ships transferred from the United States Navy to the Royal Navy